Stuart Charles Harrison (born 21 September 1951) is a former Welsh cricketer.  Harrison was a right-handed batsman who bowled right-arm fast-medium.  He was born in Cwmbran, Monmouthshire.

Harrison made his first-class debut for Glamorgan against Somerset in the 1971 County Championship.  He made four further first-class appearances for Glamorgan, the last of which came against Yorkshire in the 1977 County Championship.  In his role as a bowler, Harrison took 7 wickets in his five first-class matches, which came at an average of 44.85, with best figures of 3/55.  His List A debut came in the 1972 John Player League against Middlesex.  He made nine further List A appearances, the last of which came against Middlesex in the 1974 John Player League.  In his ten List A matches, he took 10 wickets at an average of 34.70, with best figures of 3/47.   With the bat, he scored 57 runs at a batting average of 19.00, with a high score of 20 not out.

While playing for Glamorgan between 1971 and 1974 he was training to become a teacher.  He has also served on the Glamorgan committee  He is the father of David and Adam Harrison, both of whom have played for Glamorgan.

References

External links

1951 births
Living people
Sportspeople from Cwmbran
Welsh cricketers
Glamorgan cricketers
Welsh educators